Steve Murray (born December 21, 1975), known by the pen-name  Chip Zdarsky, is a Canadian comic book artist and writer, journalist, illustrator and designer. He has also used the pseudonym Todd Diamonte. He worked for National Post for over a decade, until 2014, as an illustrator and humorist (as Steve Murray) and wrote and illustrated a column called "Extremely Bad Advice" for the paper as well as The Ampersand, the newspaper's pop culture section's online edition.

He uses the Zdarsky pseudonym for comics-related work, using it to create Prison Funnies and Monster Cops and as artist and co-creator of Sex Criminals with writer Matt Fraction. Comics attributed to him include Howard the Duck, Peter Parker: The Spectacular Spider-Man, Daredevil, Spider-Man: Life Story and Spider-Man: Spider's Shadow for Marvel Comics, Batman for DC Comics and Jughead for Archie Comics.

Early life
Steve Murray was born in Edmonton, Alberta and raised in Barrie, Ontario.

Career
Murray has illustrated for such clients as The Globe and Mail, New York magazine, CBC and Canadian Business.

In 2000, Murray created Chip Zdarsky as a pseudonym and alter ego for his persona as a comic book writer and illustrator, developing his own independent projects, such as Prison Funnies and Monster Cops (which can be read online or in print) as well as collaborating on a variety of projects, including Dark Horse Comics titles Fierce and Rumble Royale.  About his alter ego, Murray said "I wanted to have a sad-sack cartoonist persona that lives in his mom's basement, paints figurines for money, has restraining orders against him. And that became a character." He describes the character as "an idiot who doesn't know what I'm doing. I've had no success in my life. No matter what, I'm going to mess things up." Murray initially attempted to keep the identities separate and secret.

From 2008 to 2014, Murray penned and illustrated a weekly advice column for the National Post called "Extremely Bad Advice". He also wrote another column in that paper, Tear Jerk, in which he reviewed films to see if they could actually make him "weep like a baby".

Along with Kagan McLeod, Ben Shannon, and Cameron Stewart, he is a co-founder of the studio The Royal Academy of Illustration and Design, which produced Rumble Royale.

In 2010, he also launched a mock campaign for mayor of Toronto. He was not an officially registered candidate, launching his satirical "campaign" through social networking platforms after the deadline had passed to register as a candidate in the real campaign.

In June 2013, Image Comics announced that Chip Zdarsky had teamed up with Invincible Iron Man and Hawkeye writer, Matt Fraction, on a new creator-owned series titled Sex Criminals. The first issue was released on September 23, 2013. Sex Criminals was declared number 1 on Time magazine's list of "Top 10 Comics and Graphic Novels" of 2013.

In 2014, Murray won a Will Eisner Award for Best New Series for Sex Criminals.

Zdarsky wrote the first series arc of the relaunched Jughead comic for the 2015 New Riverdale relaunch.

On February 15, 2017, it was announced that beginning that June, Zdarsky would be writing a brand new "back-to-basics" Spider-Man series Peter Parker: The Spectacular Spider-Man that would run alongside writer Dan Slott's run on The Amazing Spider-Man. Zdarsky later wrote the two Spider-Man miniseries Spider-Man: Life Story and Spider-Man: Spider's Shadow.

In November 2018, it was announced that Zdarsky would serve as the writer on Daredevil, with Marco Checchetto serving as artist. The series began publication in February 2019 and lasted until November 2021 with issue 36. This leads into the event Devil's Reign, also by Zdarsky and Checchetto. A new Daredevil #1 will launch in July 2022, with Zdarsky and Checchetto returning from the previous volume. The series will explore the fallout of Devil's Reign and the effect it had on both Matt and Elektra, as both are operating as Daredevil. Zdarsky then announced that August 2023 would mark the end of his Daredevil.

In 2020, DC Comics announced that Zdarsky would be among the creators of a revived Batman: Black and White anthology series to debut on December 8, 2020.

in 2021, it was announced that Zdarsky had signed a deal with Substack to develop executive comics for the service, such as Public Domain and volume two of Kaptara with Kagan McLeod. 

In February 2022, it was announced that Zdarsky will serve as the new writer for the mainline Batman book, starting with issue 125 on July 5, with Jorge Jiménez serving as the artist.

In March 2022, it was announced that Public Domain would be heading to print via Image Comics in June 2022.

Awards and nominations

Awards
 2014 Eisner Award – Best New Series (Sex Criminals, with author Matt Fraction)
 2014 Harvey Award – Most Promising New Talent
 2014 Harvey Award – Best New Series (Sex Criminals)
 2015 Harvey Award – Special Award For Humor (Sex Criminals; rejected by winner)
 2016 Harvey Award – Special Award For Humor (Howard the Duck)
 2017 Eisner Award – Best Humor Publication (Jughead, with Ryan North, Erica Henderson and Derek Charm)
 2017 War Rocket Ajax Intercontinental Championship
 2019 Eisner Award – Best Single Issue/One-Shot (Peter Parker: The Spectacular Spider-Man #310)
 2019 Shuster Award – Best Writer (Peter Parker: The Spectacular Spider-Man, Marvel Two-in-One)
 2020 Eisner Award – Best Digital Comic (Afterlift, with artist Jason Loo)
 2021 GLAAD Media Award for Outstanding Comic Book — Empyre, Lords of Empyre: Emperor Hulkling / Empyre: Aftermath Avengers (with Al Ewing, Dan Slott and Anthony Oliveira)

Nominations
 2014 Eisner Award nominee – Best Series (Sex Criminals, with author Matt Fraction)
 2017 Eisner Award nominee – Best Publication for Teens (ages 13–17) (Jughead, with Ryan North, Erica Henderson and Derek Charm)
 2019 Eisner Award nominee – Best Writer (Peter Parker: The Spectacular Spider-Man, Marvel Two-in-One)
 2020 Eisner Award nominee – Best Writer (White Trees, Daredevil, Spider-Man: Life Story,  Afterlift), Best Continuing Series (Daredevil with Marco Checchetto)
2021 Eisner Award nominee – Best Writer (Stillwater, Daredevil, Fantastic Four/X-Men)
2021 Eisner Award nominee – Best Continuing Series (Daredevil)
2021 Eisner Award nominee – Best Continuing Series (Stillwater)

Bibliography

Archie Comics
 Jughead #1–8 (writer, October 2015 – August 2016)
Volume 1 (collects #1–6, with Erica Henderson, tpb, 168 pages, 2016)
 #7–8 (with Derek Charm, 2016), collected in Volume 2 (tpb, 144 pages, 2017)

Comixology Originals
 Afterlift #1–5 (writer, limited series, with Jason Loo, April 2020; republished by Dark Horse in February 2021, tpb, 136 pages)
 The All-Nighter #1–5 (writer, limited series, with Jason Loo, October 2021 – January 2022; republished by Dark Horse in March 2022, tpb, 136 pages)
 The All-Nighter #6-10 (writer, with Jason Loo, May 2022 – September 2022)

DC Comics
 Story in Harley Quinn 25th Anniversary Special (writer, with Joe Quinones, November 2017)
 Harley Quinn story in Dark Nights: Death Metal Guidebook (writer, with Khary Randolph, October 2020) collected in Dark Nights: Death Metal: The Darkest Knight (tpb, 208 pages, 2020)
 Story in Detective Comics #1027 (artist, with Matt Fraction, November 2020) collected as Batman: Detective Comics #1027 Deluxe Edition (hc, 184 pages, 2020)
Red Hood: Cheer in Batman: Urban Legends #1–6 (writer, with Eddy Barrows, March 2021–)
 Story in Batman: Black and White vol. 5 #4 (writer, with Nick Bradshaw, March 2021)
 Justice League: Last Ride #1–7 (writer, with Miguel Mendonça, May–November 2021) collected as Justice League: Last Ride (tpb, 154 pages, 2022)
Batman: The Knight #1–10 (writer, with Carmine Di Giandomenico, January 2022–October 2022)
Compendium Edition #1 (collects #1–3, 99 pages, 2022)
Batman vol. 3 #125– (writer, with Jorge Jiménez, July 2022–)
Volume 1: Failsafe (collects #125–130, tpb, 176 pages, 2023)

Image Comics
 Sex Criminals (artist, with Matt Fraction, September 2013 – October 2020)
Volume 1: One Weird Trick (collects #1–5, tpb, 128 pages, 2014)
 Volume 2: Two Worlds, One Cop (collects #6–10, tpb, 128 pages, 2015 )
 Volume 3: Three the Hard Way (collects #11–15, tpb, 132 pages, 2016 )
 Volume 4: Fourgy! (collects #16–20 tpb, 136 pages, 2017 ISBN  )
 Volume 5: Five-Fingered Discount (collects #21–25, tpb, 128 pages, 2018 )
 Volume 6: Six Criminals (collects #26–30, 69, tpb, 152 pages, 2020 )
 Big Hard Sex Criminals (collects #1–10, hc, 256 pages, 2015 )
 Big Hard Sex Criminals Volume 2 Deluxxxe (collects #11–20, hc, 256 pages, 2018 )
Big Hard Sex Criminals Volume 3 Deluxxxe (collects #21–30, 69, hc, 272 pages, 2021 )
 Sex Criminals: Just the Tips (artist, with Matt Fraction, December 2014)
 Kaptara (writer, with Kagan Mcleod, April–November 2015) continued digitally on Substack
Volume 1: Fear Not, Tiny Alien (collects #1–5, tpb, 128 pages, 2015)
 The White Trees #1–2 (writer, limited series, with Kris Anka, August–September 2019)
 Stillwater #1–18 (writer, with Ramón K. Pérez, September 2020–December 2022)
 Volume 1: Rage, Rage (collects #1–6, tpb, 136 pages, 2021 )
Volume 2 (collects #7–12, tpb, 128 pages, 2022)
The Silver Coin #1 (writer, with Michael Walsh, April 2021) collected in The Silver Coin, Volume 1 (tpb, 144 pages, 2021)
Crossover #7 (writer, with Phil Hester, June 2021) collected in Crossover Vol. 2: The Ten Cent Plague (tpb, 176 pages, 2022)
Newburn #1–ongoing (writer, with Jacob Phillips, November 2021–)
Volume 1 (collects #1–8, tpb, 160 pages, 2022 )
Public Domain #1–ongoing (writer/artist, reprint of Substack digital series, June 2022–)
Volume 1 (collects #1–5, tpb, 160 pages, 2023 )

Marvel Comics
Original Sins #5: The No-Sin Situation (writer/artist, October 2014) collected in Original Sins (tpb, 144 pages, 2015)
Howard the Duck vol. 5 (writer, with Joe Quinones, May–October 2015)
Volume 0: What the Duck? (collects #1–5, tpb, 112 pages, 2015)
Howard the Duck vol. 6 (writer, with Joe Quinones January–December 2016)
Volume 1: Duck Hunt (collects #1–6, The Unbeatable Squirrel Girl #6, tpb, 160 pages, 2016)
Volume 2: Good Night, and Good Duck (collects #7–11, tpb, 112 pages, 2016)
All-New, All-Different Avengers Annual #1: "The Once and Future Marvel" (artist, with Mark Waid, August 2016) collected in All-New, All-Different Avengers Vol. 3: Civil War II (tpb, 112 pages, 2017)
Civil War II: Choosing Sides #5: "Alpha Flight" (writer, with Ramón K. Pérez, October 2016) collected in Civil War II: Choosing Sides (tpb,152 pages, 2016)
Doctor Strange vol. 4 #1.MU (writer, with Julian Lopez, April 2017) collected in Monsters Unleashed: Battleground (tpb, 264 pages, 2017)
 Star-Lord vol. 2 #1–6, Annual #1 (writer, with Kris Anka, February–July 2017) collected as Star-Lord: Grounded (tpb, 168 pages, 2017)
 Peter Parker: The Spectacular Spider-Man vol. 2 (August 2017 – February 2019)
Volume 1: Into The Twilight (collects #1–6, FCBD 2017 Secret Empire, writer, tpb, with Adam Kubert and Michael Walsh, 144 pages)
 Volume 2: Most Wanted (collects #297–300, writer/artist, tpb, with Adam Kubert and Juan Frigeri, 112 pages)
Volume 3: Amazing Fantasy (collects #301–303, Annual #1, writer, tpb, with Joe Quinones, 112 pages)
Volume 4: Coming Home (collects #304–310, writer/artist, tpb, with Adam Kubert, 112 pages)
 Not Brand Echh #14: "The Not Next Issue Page" (writer/artist, January 2018) collected in Not Brand Echh: The Complete Collection (tpb, 480 pages, 2019)
 Unbeatable Squirrel Girl vol. 2 #26: "A Bird in the Hand" (artist, with Erica Henderson, January 2018) collected in The Unbeatable Squirrel Girl, Volume 7: I've Been Waiting For a Squirrel Like You (tpb, 128 pages, 2018) and The Unbeatable Squirrel Girl Vol. 4 (hc, 272 pages, 2019)
 Marvel 2-in-One vol. 2 (writer, February 2018 – January 2019) to be collected in Fantastic Four: Fate of the Four (hc, 2021)
Volume 1: Fate of the Four (collects #1–6, tpb, with Jim Cheung and Valerio Schiti, 136 pages, 2018)
Volume 2: Next of Kin (collects #7–12, Annual #1, tpb, with Declan Shalvey and Ramón K. Pérez, 160 pages, 2019)
 Doctor Strange vol. 1 #390 (co-artist, with Donny Cates and Frazer Irving, July 2018) collected in Doctor Strange by Donny Cates Vol. 2: City Of Sin (tpb, 112 pages, 2018) and Doctor Strange by Donny Cates (hc, 360 pages, 2019)
 Merry X-Men Holiday Special: "The Gift That Keeps On Giving" (writer/artist, one-shot, February 2019)
 Namor: The Best Defense #1 (writer, one-shot with Carlos Magno, February 2019) collected in Defenders: The Best Defense (tpb, 168 pages, 2019)
 Invaders vol. 3 (writer, with Carlos Magno and Butch Guice, March 2019 – February 2020) collected as Always an Invader (hc, 304 pages, 2021)
Volume 1: War Ghost (collects #1–6, tpb, 144 pages, 2019)
Volume 2: Dead in the Water (collects #7–12, tpb, 136 pages, 2020)
Daredevil vol. 6 (April 2019–December 2021)
Volume 1: Know Fear (collects #1–5, writer/artist, tpb, with Marco Checchetto, 120 pages, 2019)
Volume 2: No Devils, Only God (collects #6–10, writer, tpb, with Lalit Kumar Sharma and Jorge Fornés, 112 pages, 2019, 
Volume 3: Through Hell (collects #11–15, writer, tpb, with Marco Checchetto and Francesco Mobili 112 pages, 2020)
Volume 4: End of Hell (collects #16–20, writer, tpb, with Jorge Fornés and Marco Checchetto, 112 pages, 2020)
Volume 5: Truth/Dare (collects #21–25, Annual #1, writer, tpb, with Marco Checchetto, Francesco Mobili, and Mike Hawthorne, 144 pages, 2021)
Volume 6: Doing Time (collects #26–30, writer, tpb, with Marco Checchetto and Mike Hawthorne, 120 pages, 2021)
Volume 7: Lockdown (collects #31–36, writer, tpb, with Marco Checchetto, Mike Hawthorne, Stefano Landini, and Manuel Garcia, 2022)
Volume 1: To Heaven Through Hell (collects #1–10, hc, 232 pages, 2021)
Volume 2: To Heaven Through Hell Vol. 2 (collects #11–20, hc, 224 pages, 2022)
Volume 3: To Heaven Through Hell Vol. 3 (collects #21–30 and Annual #1, hc, 264 pages, 2022)
Daredevil vol. 7 (July 2022-ongoing)
 Volume 1: The Red Fist Saga (collects #1-5, writer, with Marco Checchetto and Rafael De Latorre, tpb, 2023)
Spider-Man: Life Story (writer, 7-issue limited series, with Mark Bagley, May 2019 – August 2021) collected as Spider-Man: Life Story (tpb, 208 pages, 2019) and Spider-Man: Life Story (hc, 240 pages, 2021)
 War of the Realms: War Scrolls #1: "Waugh of the Realms" (writer, with Joe Quinones, June 2019) collected in War of the Realms Omnibus (hc, 1576 pages, 2020)
 Marvel Comics #1000: "Armor: Disassemble": (writer/artist, one-shot, October 2019) collected as Marvel Comics #1000 (hc, 144 pages, 2020)
 Amazing Spider-Man: Full Circle (co-writer, one-shot, with Rachel Stott and various, December 2019) collected as Amazing Spider-Man: Full Circle (hc, 128 pages, 2020)
X-Men/Fantastic Four vol. 2 #1–4 (writer, 4-issue limited series, with Terry Dodson, April–September 2020) collected as X-Men/Fantastic Four: 4X (tpb, 128 pages, 2020)
Doom 2099 vol. 2 #1 (writer, one-shot, with Marco Castiello, February 2020) collected in Amazing Spider-Man 2099 Companion (tpb 296 pages, 2020)
 Incoming! #1: "5–8" (writer, one-shot, with Jorge Fornés, February 2020) collected in Road to Empyre (tpb, 2020)
Lords of Empyre: Emperor Hulkling #1 (co-writer, one-shot, with Anthony Oliveira and Manuel Garcia, September 2020) collected in Empyre: Lords of Empyre (tpb, 168 pages, 2020)
Spider-Man: Spider's Shadow (writer, 5-issue limited series, with Pasqual Ferry, April–August 2021) collected in Spider-Man: Spider's Shadow (tpb, 128 pages, 2021)
Story in Carnage: Black, White & Blood #2 (writer, with Marco Checchetto, April 2021)
Story in Free Comic Book Day 2021: Spider-Man/Venom (one-shot, with Greg Smallwood, August 2021)
Devil's Reign (writer, 6-issue limited series, with Marco Checchetto, December 2021 – April 2022) collected in Devil's Reign (tpb, 208 pages, 2022)
Daredevil: Woman Without Fear (writer, 3-issue limited series, with Rafael De Latorre, January–March 2022) collected in Daredevil: Woman Without Fear (tpb, 120 pages, 2022)

Other publishers 

 Royal Academy of Illustration & Design
Monster Cops (writer/artist, 2003; republished by Legion of Evil Press in 2006)
 Legion of Evil Press
 Prison Funnies #1–2 (writer/artist, 2003)
 Chip Zdarsky's Monster Cops (writer/artist, 2006)
 Comics Festival!: Monster Cops (writer/artist, 2007–2009)
 Substack
 Kaptara #6–ongoing (writer, with Kagan Mcleod, August 2021– )
 Public Domain #1–ongoing (writer/artist, September 2021–)

References

External links

"Extremely Bad Advice" column

1975 births
Artists from Edmonton
Canadian comics artists
Canadian editorial cartoonists
Canadian satirists
Living people
National Post people